Narcine brasiliensis, the Brazilian electric ray or lesser numbfish, is a species of electric ray in the family Narcinidae.  It inhabits coastal waters of the Southwest Atlantic from Southern Brazil through Uruguay to northern Argentina.

Habitat
This species is considered a “warm water species”. When there's a temperature gradient between an inshore and an offshore they will habituate at the depths with the highest temperature (Menni 2000). The density of this species had a higher concentration in temperatures that were greater than 20ºC (Vianna 2009). They prefer shallow waters because that is usually the warmest part of the water. During the summer, they are abundant in coastal water with depths that go to 20 meters and in the winter, they are still in that area but in a lower concentration and at deeper depths, about 40-50 meters, to avoid the cold temperatures. (Vianna 2009) This behavior points toward a migration towards the south in the summer because of the warmer water with higher salinity. The salinity range that they prefer is from 24% to 36% (Menni 2000). They also hunt and hide around areas with soft sand and/or mud substrate.

Geographic range
This species of ray is generally found in the Western hemisphere, around the Southern coast of the North America and the Eastern and Norther coast of South America. They are widely distributed in tropical latitudes, with the highest concentrations near the tropical west Indo-Pacific region, they are also considered an endemic species of the western Atlantic Ocean (Wosnick 2018). There have been a few locations along the coast of Brazil where they have been reported, those include, Rio Grande do Sul, Paraná State, Cananéia, Ubatuba, Bahia State, Pernambuco State, Paraíba State, Maranhã State, and Pará and Amapá States (Menni 2000). Those locations are all on the coast of Brazil. On the East of the United States they are found in the waters along the coast of Florida, Georgia, South Carolina, and North Carolina. On the South of the United States they are located on the southern coast of Florida, Alabama and Mississippi (GBIF).

Description

They are small to moderate sized, reaching no more than about 45 centimeters in total length (Vianna 2009). The shape of their body is an oval shape, with two dorsal fins that are around the same size (Wosnick 2018), the caudal fin is shaped like a triangle and there is no spine on the caudal fin on this ray, unlike some other species. On the dorsal side of their body they have a brown coloration and a white coloration on their ventral side. They have more of an elongated/protruding body size, they aren't very short or rounded, this helps to differentiate them from other ray species (Olfers 1831). The jaw arch, which consist of the lower and upper jaw, moves as a unit, this allows for them to create suction in order to feed and capture prey hiding in the sand or mud substrate. The limitation to this is, there are a series of ligaments that constrict the jaws from moving in other directions, because of this it may cause limits in their diet, but at the same time increase their suction ability (Dean 2004).

They have an electroreceptor system located on the ventral part of their body that is sensitive to low frequency, they use this in order to search for prey. The system is composed of many sensory units, known as Ampullae of Lorenzini, these are connected to the environment and the nervous system through external pores and canals by nerves and fibers (Wosnick 2018). What is special about this species, is they have electric organs that can generate an average voltage about 0.35 mV (Macesic 2008). The organs are located in their pectoral fins and they are noticeable when you look at the ray from the frontal few. The lobules have hexagonal faces and they show their shape through the skin (Olfers 1831). The size and number of the cells in the electric organs are higher in adults than in embryos/newborns, this causes the newborns to generate weaker electric organ discharge (Macesic 2008), which makes them more vulnerable to predators.

Not much is known about their life cycle, but what is known is they have a very long surviving capacity and a low natural mortality rate. Natural meaning death by predators, most of them die from anthropogenic causes which is discussed in later sections.

Males vs. Females
While the females reach a larger overall size than males, features such as the eyes, mouth, and nostrils are larger in males. The tails on males are longer than females’ tails because the posterior region of the body develops at a faster rate than the total length. The larger sizes of females helps with the nourishment of the embryos. The males also have higher values of the proportions of the dorsal fins, and the superior lobe of their caudal fin. The females have a wider trunk (main part of the body), this is because they have to accommodate all of the embryos that they hold. Males have a greater proportion of their electric organs than females, this may be another example of resource allocation in this species since the females have to use more energy to produce nutrients for the embryos.(Macesic 2008)

Development
Although little is known about this species’ life cycle, scientist do know that they have slow growth the birth is viviparous. Since they are born live, as they are developing inside the womb, each individual ray (or pup) has a yolk-sac which they use for obtaining nutrients as they are growing in the womb. As they grow bigger and get closer to being birthed by the mother, those nutrients are used up. The three main stages of this ray are a neonate (newborn), a juvenile, and an adult. As for their electric organs, neonates don't have a lot of electric cells so they can't give off as much of a voltage as juveniles and adults (Macesic 2008).

Reproduction
Sexual maturity occurs when males have a total length of about 25 centimeters and when females have a total length of about 30 centimeters (Wosnick 2018). Although there is low fecundity, generally, in females, they can produce about 4-15 embryos per pregnancy. Also, as females increase in size their fecundity increases as well, meaning there is a selective advantage on larger sized female rays. Since males are generally smaller in size than females, they also mature sexually at smaller sizes compared to females. Most pregnancy in females occurs in the summer and the autumn, and pre-ovulatory periods in females occurred in the winter. in males calcifying claspers were observed during the summer, autumn, and winter. Going along with this pattern in males in females, there is an annual reproductive cycle with a mating season during the spring and a pregnancy and birth season during the summer and the autumn. There is a high energy requirement during the courtship and mating process, there may be bite marks observed in sexually mature female and male dorsal regions during the mating period.

Behavior
This species of ray migrates around November and December from the north (Menni 2000) to areas with a depth of about 20 meters, and then migrate again during May and June (Menni 2000) to areas with a depth of about 10 meters. This migration is mainly driven by reproductive opportunities or feeding opportunities (Vianna 2009). The migration has also been associated with the higher temperatures in the south during the winter months, they have been observed having a sluggish and slow-moving sort of behavior if they are in water that is less than 20 ºC (Vianna 2009). They spend most of the time buried in the substrate or in murky water because of their demersal habits, in order to hide for predators or search for prey (Macesic 2008). Unlike some other electric ray species, this species of electric ray generally only uses its electric organs for predator defense and intraspecific communication (Wosnick 2018). When it comes to neonates, since they are smaller in size, they have smaller electric organs, so when they are defending themselves against predators, they discharge a greater number of electric organ discharges than juveniles and adults, in order to make up for their size.

Ecosystem role
The Brazilian electric ray is considered a macropredator in its habitat and it plays an important part in the ecosystem dynamics. The most important role they play is population control, they keep the number of polychaetas and crustaceans down which then helps the population of algae. If they weren't located in the ecosystem there would be too many crustaceans and they would ruin the ecosystem. Since these rays help with the population numbers of algae, they are also known to help in connecting the lower and the higher trophic levels. Since they play such important roles, changes in their populations may lead to negative changes in the ecosystem at all the tropic levels.

Food habits
Since the Brazilian electric ray is a benthic feeder, they mainly feed on invertebrates that are buried in the sand, for example, polychaetas are one of the main foods of its diet (Vianna 2009). Some other things that this species has been known for feeding on are crustaceans, marine worms, poriferans (sponges), echinoderms (starfish), and some other types of benthonic fish. When they do catch prey, they use benthonic pressure suction in order to take the prey into their mouth and swallow it whole. In order to create that suction to get their prey, they extend their jaws into the substrate, then they retract their jaws very quickly and create the “super ambient orobranchial pressure” (Dean 2004) to get rid of any sediment taken in and draw food towards the esophagus. Since they have a lot of muscle control in their mouths, these rays are able to remove the exoskeletons of crustaceans, squid mantels, and bivalve shells in order to eat only the indigestible parts (Dean 2004).

Relationship to humans
As stated in the lifespan/longevity section, most of their deaths are caused by anthropogenic effects. One of these main effects, is the fishing industry, since they have been responsible for the decline of several populations of this species over the past 30 years (Vianna 2009). They are usually discarded as bycatch when they are caught accidentally by trawl nets. Even though the fishermen may throw the rays back into the water alive they have been observed to sustain injuries from this. Some of those injuries observed are contusion in the bottom portion of their body (the most common injury), many deep cuts, fractures, and partial, even total, loss of body parts (Wosnick 2018).

In the economy, they really have no commercial value, they are only caught by accident usually. Their release as by-catch from the trawl nets is even considered an annoyance and a challenge by fishermen because of the electric discharges that the rays are giving off as they are being handled (Wosnick 2018). They give off these electric discharges because they believe they are being attacked by a predator and the fisherman are just throwing them back into the water, although not many make it back to the water with no injuries.

Conservation Status
Since Brazilian electric rays don't have any commercial importance, there aren't many statistics on the commercial fisheries of this species and no statistics on efforts that would enable a population status assessment.(Vianna 2009) The IUCN Red List of Threatened Species put this species in the Near Threatened category. They need more studies to determine the taxonomic issues, population dynamics, morphology, and distribution. However, most of them are killed by the fishing industry and since this industry is so huge it is likely that they may be threatened, since the depth that they exist and proliferate in is the same depth that is interrupted by shrimp trawls.

References 

Works cited

Gilbert, Carter Rowell. National Audubon Society Field Guide to North American Fishes, Whales, and Dolphins. New York, Alfred A. Knopf Inc., 1983, pp. 272.
Macesic, Laura J. “Electric organ morphology in the lesser electric ray, Narcine brasiliensis.” Zoology, vol. 112, no. 6, 2009, pp.442-450. 

Menni, Roberto C. “Distribution, environment and biology of batoid fishes off Argentina, Uruguay and Brazil. A review.” Revistas del Museo Argentino de Ciencias naturales, vol. 2, no. 1, 2000, pp. 69-109. 
“Narcine brasiliensis (Olfers, 1831).” Global Diversity Information Facility. https://gbif.org/species/2417770, assessed 24 October 2019. 

Vianna, Gabriel Maciel de Souza. “Distribution and Abundance of the Lesser Electric Ray Narcine brasiliensis (Olfers, 1831) (Elasmobranchii: Narcinidae) in Southern Brazil in Relation to Environmental Factors.” Brazilian Journal of Oceanography, vol. 57, no. 2, 2009, pp. 105–112.
Wosnick, Natascha. “Do Physical Injuries Affect Electroreception? A Case Study on the Brazilian Electric Ray, Narcine braciliensis (Olfers, 1931).” Hydrobiology Lab Newsletter, vol. 28, 2018, pp. 35–38.

brasiliensis
Fish of the Western Atlantic
Fish of Brazil
Fish of Uruguay
Fish described in 1831
Taxa named by Ignaz von Olfers